This is a list of compositions by the American composer Leonard Bernstein.

Ballet

Fancy Free (later provided material for "On the Town" and "West Side Story") (1944)
Facsimile, Choreographic Essay for Orchestra (1946)
Dybbuk (1974)

Opera
Trouble in Tahiti (1951)
Candide (1956, new libretto in 1973, operetta final revised version in 1989)
A Quiet Place (1983)

Musicals
On The Town (1944)
Peter Pan (1950)
Wonderful Town (1953)
West Side Story (1957)
A Party with Betty Comden and Adolph Green (1958, collaboration)
The Race to Urga (1969 - incomplete)
"By Bernstein" (a Revue) (1975)
1600 Pennsylvania Avenue (1976)
The Madwoman of Central Park West (contributed to 1979)

Incidental music and other theatre
The Birds (1938)
The Peace (1940)
 The Lark (1955)
Salome, for Chamber Orchestra and Solo Voices
 The Firstborn, for Voice and Percussion (1958)
 MASS: A Theatre Piece for Singers, Players, and Dancers (1971)

Film scores
 On the Town (1949) (only part of his music was used)
 On the Waterfront (1954)
 West Side Story (1961)

Orchestral
Symphony No. 1 Jeremiah (1942)
 Suite from Fancy Free (concert premiere 1945)
Three Dance Episodes from "On the Town" (concert premiere 1946)
Symphony No. 2 The Age of Anxiety (after W. H. Auden) for Piano and Orchestra (1949, revised in 1965)
Prelude, Fugue, and Riffs, for Solo Clarinet and Jazz Ensemble (1949)
Serenade after Plato's "Symposium" (1954)
 Symphonic Suite from On the Waterfront (1955)
 Overture to Candide (1956)
 Symphonic Dances from West Side Story (1960)
Fanfare for the Inauguration of John F. Kennedy, (for the inauguration of John F. Kennedy) for Orchestra (1961)
Fanfare II, (for the 25th anniversary of the High School of Music and Art) for Orchestra (1961)
Symphony No. 3 Kaddish, for Orchestra, Mixed Chorus, Boys' Choir, Speaker and Soprano Solo (1963, revised in 1977)
Three Meditations from "Mass", for Orchestra (1972)
Dybbuk, Suites No. 1 and 2, for Orchestra (Originally Dybbuk Variations from 1974, concert premieres 1975 and 1977)
Songfest: A Cycle of American Poems for Six Singers and Orchestra (1977)
Three Meditations from "Mass", for Violoncello and Orchestra (1977)
Slava! A Political Overture, for Orchestra (1977)
CBS Music, for Orchestra (1977)
 Divertimento for Orchestra (1980)
A Musical Toast, for Orchestra (1980)
Halil, nocturne for Solo Flute, Piccolo, Alto Flute, Percussion, Harp and Strings (1981)
Opening Prayer (originally Jubilee Games from 1986, revised in 1988 and 1989)

Choral
Hashkivenu, for Cantor (tenor), Mixed Chorus and Organ (1945)
Simchu Na, arrangement of a traditional Hebrew song for Mixed Chorus and Piano or Orchestra (1947)
Reena, arrangement of a traditional Hebrew song for Mixed Chorus and Orchestra (1947)
Yigdal, Hebrew liturgical melody for Mixed Chorus and piano (1950)
Harvard Choruses, for Mixed Chorus (1957)
Chichester Psalms, for Boy Soprano (or Countertenor), Mixed Chorus, and Orchestra (Reduced version for Organ, Harp and Percussion) (1965)
Warm-Up, round for Mixed Chorus (1970)
A Little Norton Lecture, (after E. E. Cummings) for Men's Chorus (1973)
White House Cantata, for Soprano, Mezzo-Soprano, Tenor, Bass, Mixed Chorus and Orchestra (1976). See 1600 Pennsylvania Avenue (musical).
Olympic Hymn, for Mixed Chorus and Orchestra (1981)
Missa Brevis, for Mixed Chorus and Countertenor Solo, with Percussion (1988)

Chamber music
Piano Trio (1937)
 Violin Sonata (1940)
 Four Studies for two Clarinets, two Bassoons and Piano (c. 1940)
Sonata for Clarinet and Piano (1942)
Fanfare for Bima, for Brass Quartet (composed as a birthday tribute to Koussevitzky using the tune he whistled to call his cocker spaniel) (1948)
Elegy for Mippy I, for Horn and Piano (1948)
Elegy for Mippy II, for Trombone Solo (1948)
Waltz for Mippy III, for Tuba and Piano (1948)
Rondo for Lifey, for Trumpet and Piano (1948)
Shivaree: A Fanfare, for Double Brass Ensemble and Percussion (commissioned by and dedicated to the Metropolitan Museum of Art in New York in honor of its Centenary; musical material later used in "Mass.") (1969)
Dance Suite, for Brass Quintet (1989)
Variations on an Octatonic Scale, for Recorder and Violoncello (1989)

Vocal music
Psalm 148, for voice and piano (1935)
I Hate Music: A cycle of Five Kid Songs for Soprano and Piano (1943)
Big Stuff, sung by Billie Holiday (1944)
Afterthought, study for the ballet "Facsimile" for Soprano and Piano or Orchestra (1945) 
La Bonne Cuisine: Four Recipes for Voice and Piano (1947)
Two Love Songs on Poems by Rainer Maria Rilke for Voice and Piano (1949)
Silhouette (Galilee), for Voice and Piano (1951)
On the Waterfront, for Voice and Piano (1954)
Get Hep!, Marching Song written for the Tercentary of Michigan State College for Voice and Piano (1955)
So Pretty, for Voice and Piano (1968)
Haiku Souvenirs, five songs for voice and piano
Vayomer Elohim, for Voice and Piano (1974)
My New Friend, for Voice and Piano (1979)
Piccola Serenata, for Voice and Piano (1979)
Opening Prayer, for Baritone and Orchestra (written for the reopening of Carnegie Hall) (1986)
Arias and Barcarolles, for Mezzo-Soprano, Baritone and Piano four-hands (1988)
My Twelve Tone Melody, for Voice and Piano (written for Irving Berlin's 100th birthday) (1988)

Piano music
 Music for Two Pianos (1937)
Non troppo presto (Music for the Dance No. I) (1938)
 Sonata for the Piano (1938)
Music for the Dance No. II (1938)
Scenes from the City of Sin, eight miniatures for Piano four-hands (1939)
 Arrangement of Aaron Copland's El Salón México for piano or two pianos (1941)
Seven Anniversaries (1943)
Four Anniversaries (1948)
Four Sabras (1950)
Five Anniversaries (1951)
Bridal Suite (1960)
Moby Diptych (1981) (republished as Anniversaries nos. 1 and 2 in Thirteen Anniversaries)
Touches (1981)
Thirteen Anniversaries (1988)

Other music
Babel: a holocaust opera
The Caucasian Chalk Circle, Songs after Bertold Brecht
The Skin of Our Teeth (1964): an aborted work from which Bernstein took material to use in his "Chichester Psalms"
Alarums and Flourishes (1980): an aborted work from which Bernstein took material to use in "A Quiet Place"
Tucker: an aborted concept for a musical version of the 1988 film "Tucker: The Man and His Dream"

References

Sources